At Yoshi's is a live album by saxophonist George Coleman recorded in 1989 at Yoshi's in Oakland, California and released on the Theresa label. It was later issued on CD by the Evidence label.

Reception

In his review for AllMusic, Michael G. Nastos observed: "the whole CD from top to bottom has Coleman and his band inspired to the hilt and playing their best, and At Yoshi's is a highly recommended effort that deserves a space on each and every jazz lover's shelf".

Track listing
All compositions by George Coleman, except as indicated
 "They Say It's Wonderful" (Irving Berlin) - 11:24    
 "Good Morning Heartache" (Ervin Drake, Dan Fisher, Irene Higginbotham) - 8:38    
 "Laig Gobblin' Blues" - 4:05    
 "Io" (Paul Arslanian) - 6:36    
 "Up Jumped Spring" (Freddie Hubbard) - 12:14    
 "Father" - 7:10 Bonus track on CD reissue
 "Soul Eyes" (Mal Waldron) - 16:42 Bonus track on CD reissue

Personnel
George Coleman - tenor saxophone
Harold Mabern - piano   
Ray Drummond - bass
Alvin Queen - drums

References

1989 live albums
George Coleman live albums
Theresa Records live albums